Mughan plain (مغان دوزو) is a plain stretching from northwestern Iran to the southern part of the Republic of Azerbaijan. The highest density of irrigation canals is in the section of the Mughan plain which lies in the Republic of Azerbaijan. It is located on the bank of the Aras river extending to Iran.

The Mughan plain consists of five cities: Bilehard, Parsabad, Jafarabad, Germi and Aslan Duz. One-third of the plain is located in Iran and the rest is in Azerbaijan.
From 1353 to 1372, Garmi was the center of this city. After that, Mughan was divided into three cities, Bileh Savar, Garmi and Parsabad. 
The soil of this plain is very fertile.

History

Prehistory

Alikomektepe

The ancient settlement of Alikomektepe, dating to  5000 BC, is located in the Mughan plain and covers an area of over 1 hectare. Early levels belonged to Shulaveri-Shomu culture.

Mughan culture

Abbasid Caliphate

Mughan was a province of the Abbasid Caliphate, in present-day Iranian Azerbaijan.

Shirvan Khanate

Mughan District was one of the administrative divisions of Shirvan Khanate.

After 1820

After 1820, the Shirvan Khanate was conquered by the Russian Empire.

Maps

See also
 Garayazi plain
 Arran (Caucasus)
 Azerbaijan–Iran border

Notes

References
 MOḠĀN in Iranica

Plains of Azerbaijan
Plains of Iran